Sean Kearns (born 24 December 1968 in North Vancouver, British Columbia) is a filmmaker, producer and entrepreneur who gained public attention during the late '80s and early '90s as a professional snowboarder and a sponsored skateboarder. Kearns was a key player in the Whiskey snowboard films (Whiskey 1, Whiskey 2 Whiskey 3, Whiskey 4 and 20/20) during the 1990s. The Whiskey movies are revered as cult classics. in the snowboard culture.

Noted in the book Snowboarding: The Ultimate Guide  as being among the creators of the hardcore image associated with the professional snowboarding lifestyle, Kearns leveraged his experience within the snowboarding culture and continued to work in the industry as a filmmaker, director and producer, working on several snowboarding and skateboarding films that were sponsored by brands, including Burton, Volcom, and Oakley.

Professional athlete 

Sponsors

As a professional skateboarder for Quiksilver (1984-1990) and as a professional snowboarder riding for Santa Cruz (1990-1999) Kearns was cited in Thrasher Magazine,  and had a snowboard named after him called the Santa Cruz Sean Kearns Respect Snowboard.

Business career 

In 2004, Kearns founded Infamous Management Inc, a management agency representing professionals in the skateboarding, snowboarding, and surfing industry, including J.P. Walker.  In 2005 Kearns launched Infamous Entertainment Inc., a production company that specializes in action sport filmmaking. In 2006, Infamous Entertainment Inc secured a studio accreditation from iTunes for the Forum movie "That".

Filmography 

1994 Whiskey 1 Co-directed and produced with Canadian, Sean Johnson
1995 Whiskey 2 Co-directed and produced with Canadian, Sean Johnsonn
1996 20/20 Co-directed and produced with Canadian, Sean Johnson
1998 Whiskey 4 Co-directed and produced with Canadian, Sean Johnson
1999 Technical Difficulties Cinematographer, Mack Dawg Productions
2000 The Resistance Director, Mack Dawg Productions
2001 True Life Director, Mack Dawg Productions
2001 "Out Cold" Stunt performer, Touchstone Pictures and Spyglass Entertainment
2002 Nixon Jib Fest Director, Mack Dawg productions
2003 Shakedown Director, Mack Dawg Productions
2003 Breakdown on Shakedown Director, Mack Dawg Productions
2004 Chulksmack Cinematographer, Mack Dawg Productions
2006 That Co-producer, Forum Snowboards

References 

Canadian male snowboarders
1968 births
Living people